Maciej Michalski, a polish film director. He is popularly known for creating video clips for the Polish singer Justyna Steczkowska.

Music video clips
 If You Wanted - Indigo (2004)
 Call Me - Justyna Steczkowska (2004)
 Reborn - Fliper (2005)
 It Will Be Like That - Indigo (2006)
 Peace Of Heaven - Indigo (2006)
 My Greatest Dream - Irena Jarocka (2005)
 Johny - Justyna Steczkowska (2006)
 The Sun - Justyna Steczkowska (2006)
 Tu I Tu - Justyna Steczkowska (2006)
 Give Me A Moment - Justyna Steczkowska (2007)
 The Mystery Of Fellings - Justyna Steczkowska (2008)
 I Am Going Back Home - Justyna Steczkowska (2008)

Filmography
 SCANDA, 2003 (Cast: Monika Burzyńska, Joanna Gołdyn, Danuta Wiśniewska, Music by Justyna Steczkowska)
 The Doll’s House, 2005 (Cast: Justyna Steczkowska, Monika Burzyńska, Magda Koper, Joanna Gołdyn, Ela Binkowska)
 Olives Oil, 2008 (Documentary)
 The Snow Queen, 2009 (Drama)

References

Polish film directors
Living people
1981 births